Rue Zadkine is a commercial street in the 13th arrondissement of Paris, named after the sculptor of Russian descent Ossip Zadkine.  It runs from the Rue Baudoin  to the Rue Duchefdelaville.  It has a length of some 90m, and broadens from a width of 15m to 25m along its length.

The closest métro stations are: 
 Chevaleret (approx. 300 m)
 Bibliothèque François Mitterrand (approx. 400 m).

It is within a kilometer of the following notable sites:
Bibliothèque Nationale de France;
Pont de Bercy;
Pont de Tolbiac.

One of Karina Bisch's paintings of contemporary situated buildings is entitled rue Zadkine (02.17).

History
The street was created in 1994 during the development of the ZAC (Zone d’Aménagement Concerté) Chevaleret-Jeanne d'Arc. It was originally denominated CE/13. It covers the entirety of what was the cul-de-sac Duchefdelaville.

Composition
 n° 1 :  The Galerie Kréo;
 n° 4 :  APF SESSD (Association des paralysés de France, Association of the paralysed)  (Service de Soins Enfants, Childcare services);
 n° 5 :  SYNDICAT DES JOURNALISTES ET ECRIVAINS (Trade Union of Journalists and Writers);
 n° 6 : Geneviève Leblanc, national delegate for Miss France.

External links
Map of Paris (browser plugin required)

Zadkine, Rue